Gregory John Orchard Dunstan was Dean of Armagh until 2020.

Born in 1950, grew up in England, he was educated at Trinity College, Dublin; and ordained in 1991. He began his ecclesiastical career with a curacy in Ballymena, after which he was the incumbent at St Matthew, Belfast until his appointment as Dean.

References

1950 births
Alumni of Trinity College Dublin
Deans of Armagh
Living people